is a Japanese comedy manga series written and illustrated by Hiroaki Mizusaki. It has been serialized online via Flex Comix's Comic Meteor website since April 2019 and has been collected in five tankōbon volumes. An anime television series adaptation by Quad aired from January to April 2022 on ABC and TV Asahi's  programming block.

Plot
Throughout Japan, there are both evil secret organizations that seek to conquer the world, and superheroes who rise up to challenge them. One such evil organization, Agastia, operates out of a base hidden underneath a front company headquartered somewhere in Tokyo. Agastia's attempts to conquer the world are often thwarted by the superhero Divine Swordsman Blader. This story focuses on Miss Kuroitsu, an assistant in Agastia's Monster Development Department, responsible for creating a monster powerful enough to defeat Blader once and for all. However, this organization operates like any large corporation, as Kuroitsu and her Department are forced to fight for resources and funding with other Departments in the organization, make proposals to the board to justify their costs, or deal with their leader's whims forcing them to redo their designs at the last minute.

Characters

The titular Miss Kuroitsu, an assistant for the evil secret society Agastia's Monster Development Department, who finds herself forced to balance the outrageous and sometimes contradictory demands of her superiors as she tries to create monsters to fight against Agastia's enemies.

Kuroitsu's superior, an intelligent professor who usually wears a high-tech visor over his eyes. However, his laid-back demeanor often interferes with his work, forcing Kuroitsu to fix issues that arise. It is later revealed that Hajime is the older brother of Kenji, but neither one knows about the other's secret identity.

One of Agastia's latest monsters, a wolfman whose body was abruptly changed to a wolfgirl before completion, after Akashic demanded Bete be "cuter." After surviving his initial battle with Blader, Bete was transferred into the Monster Development Department as another assistant.

The Chief of Staff for Agastia whose menacing appearance hides a pragmatic temperament. He often works overtime to keep Agastia running smoothly, and is not afraid to go against Akashic when necessary.

The leader of Agastia, a small girl with a flighty personality who secretly wields immense strength.

A 22-year-old convenience store worker who is secretly the superhero Divine Swordsman Blader that Agastia is fighting against. He has a crush on Kuroitsu, as she is a frequent guest at his shop, but is unaware of her real job. Later revealed to be the younger brother of Doctor Sadamaki, but neither sibling is aware of the other's secret identity.

A seemingly-immortal vampire lady known as the "Pluripotent Cellular Executive" of Agastia. She takes pride in her work and ability to audit the departments underneath her. Outside of work, she is a secretly a big fan of a certain idol group.

A monster designed by committee. Initially a giant mech with railguns and thunder-strike abilities, but over the course of development and several meetings between Agastia's departments, it was heavily scaled down until it was finally released as a large, robotic yellow bird with a visor attached.

Another of Kuroitsu's monsters who was scaled back due to time and budget constraints. Originally designed as a monster with regenerating abilities and eight extra heads that spit venom, the venom was cut out of the final product and even after revisions only four extra heads were added. In addition, each head has a separate personality and they often bicker with each other.

A contract worker from a rural part of Japan who moved to Tokyo for work, she accidentally becomes a low-level henchman for different villains under Matsuyama.

A foreman for the "Death Staff Temp Agency" who supplies different evil organizations in Japan with low-level henchmen.
 / 

One half of the licensed Magical Girls: Pilia Magia duo. An incredibly short-tempered middle-school girl.
 / 

One half of the licensed Magical Girls: Pilia Magia duo. A taller boy who is Reo's classmate, his Magical Girl body is that of a slightly shorter girl but with larger breasts than Reo, making her jealous.

Sadamaki's former classmate who runs the Monster Development Department for Black Lore.

Hoen's assistant who enjoys teasing Wolf Bete whenever they meet.

A monster composed of homemade chocolate in hopes of creating a Valentine's Day themed monster to fight Blader. Melty was later scrapped after it was revealed the chocolate used to make her was embedded with metal pieces. However, the Monster Development Department kept Melty's design and brings her out on various occasions. 

A middle-manager working for Black Lore, carrying out his leader's wishes. After being hit by Bull Head's psychic attack, he immediately quit the company.

The leader of the evil organization Black Lore

Media

Manga
Miss Kuroitsu from the Monster Development Department is written and illustrated by Hiroaki Mizusaki. A one-shot was first published on Flex Comix's Comic Meteor website on April 17, 2019. A full serialization began on the same platform on October 7, 2020.

Anime
In July 2021, an anime adaptation was announced by Flex Comix. It was later revealed to be a television series produced by Quad and directed by Hisashi Saitō, with Katsuhiko Takayama overseeing the series' scripts, Kazuya Morimae designing the characters, and manzo composing the music. It aired from January 9 to April 3, 2022, on ABC and TV Asahi's  programming block. AXXX1S performed the opening theme song "Special force," while Maybe Me performed the ending theme songs "Aimai Identity" and "Destiny." Crunchyroll licensed the series outside of Asia. Medialink licensed the series in Southeast Asia, South Asia, and Oceania minus Australia and New Zealand.

Episode list

Notes

References

External links
  
  
 

2022 anime television series debuts
Anime series based on manga
Asahi Broadcasting Corporation original programming
Comedy anime and manga
Comic Meteor manga
Crunchyroll anime
Japanese comedy webcomics
Medialink
Shōnen manga
Superheroes in anime and manga
Supervillain comics
Supervillain television shows
Tokusatsu television series
Webcomics in print